Ira Felix Thomas (January 22, 1881 – October 11, 1958) was an American professional baseball player. He played all or part of ten seasons of Major League Baseball, all in the American League, with the New York Highlanders (1906–07), Detroit Tigers (1908), and Philadelphia Athletics (1909–15), primarily as a catcher.

Thomas was born in Ballston Spa, New York, and began his playing career in the minor Connecticut League in 1902. After playing two seasons with the Highlanders in the major leagues, Thomas moved to the Tigers in 1908 and served as backup catcher to Boss Schmidt. In Game 1 of the 1908 World Series, he pinch hit for shortstop Charley O'Leary in the ninth inning and singled for the first pinch base hit in World Series play. 

He played six seasons to finish his career with the Athletics. He was the team captain and shared equal catching duty with Jack Lapp as the Athletics won consecutive World Series in 1910 and 1911. The team also won an American League pennant and a World Series, in 1913 and 1914, respectively, although Thomas did not play in either of the latter two World Series. In the 1911 season, Thomas finished eighth in American League MVP voting, with 17 extra base hits and 101 total bases. In 484 career games, he batted .242 with 327 hits and 155 RBI.

In 1918, while the great Influenza hammered Philadelphia, Ira volunteered at great personal risk to drive the sick to hospital for treatment.

After retiring, Thomas was a scout for the Athletics, remaining with the franchise even as it relocated to Kansas City in 1955. He died in Philadelphia in 1958, aged 77.

External links

Major League Baseball catchers
New York Highlanders players
Detroit Tigers players
Philadelphia Athletics players
Philadelphia Athletics scouts
Hartford Senators players
Newark Sailors players
Providence Grays (minor league) players
Providence Clamdiggers (baseball) players
Minor league baseball managers
Baseball players from New York (state)
1881 births
1958 deaths